Allan Aloysius Ryan (July 4, 1903 – October 13, 1981) was an American financier and politician from New York.

Life
He was born on July 4, 1903, in Manhattan, New York City, the son of Allan Aloysius Ryan (1880–1940) and Sarah (Tack) Ryan (1879–1957). Allan A. Ryan Sr. was a son of Thomas Fortune Ryan (1851–1928), and was a stock broker like his father. Ryan Sr. speculated heavily on the stock exchange, went bankrupt in 1922, and was disinherited by his father.

Ryan Jr. attended Canterbury School, and graduated from Princeton University in 1924. Then he worked in Wall Street, to learn the stock business from the bottom up. In 1928, he inherited a fortune from his grandfather, and opened an investment banking firm with Charles H. Sabin Jr. He got a seat on the New York Stock Exchange in 1930.

On February 5, 1929, Ryan Jr. married Janet Newbold. They were divorced in June 1936. On January 19, 1937, he married Eleanor Barry, a fashion editor of Harper's Bazaar.

Ryan Jr. had a country estate in Rhinebeck and bred Aberdeen Angus cattle in Dutchess County. He was a member of the New York State Senate, representing the 28th district (Columbia, Dutchess and Putnam counties) from 1939 to 1942, sitting in the 162nd and 163rd New York State Legislatures. On May 29, 1941, Ryan was divorced from his wife Eleanor.  On August 5, 1941, he married Priscilla (St. George) Duke, daughter of Congresswoman Katharine St. George (1894–1983) and ex-wife of Angier Biddle Duke (1915–1995).

During World War II he became a major in the U.S. Army, and served with the Allied Military Government in Europe. After the war, he was Chairman of the Board of the Royal Typewriter Company and, after a merger in 1954, became Chairman of the Board of Royal McBee.

On September 2, 1950, Ryan was divorced from his wife Priscilla. On December 13, 1950, he married Grace Amory, a noted amateur golfer.

He died on October 13, 1981, in New York Hospital in Manhattan.

Sources

1903 births
1981 deaths
20th-century American businesspeople
20th-century American politicians
American chairpersons of corporations
American stockbrokers
Animal breeders
Businesspeople from New York City
Canterbury School (Connecticut) alumni
Military personnel from New York City
New York Stock Exchange people
People from Rhinebeck, New York
Politicians from Manhattan
Princeton University alumni
Republican Party New York (state) state senators
United States Army personnel of World War II
United States Army officers